The 1951–52 international cricket season was from September 1951 to April 1952.

Season overview

November

England in India

West Indies in Australia

MCC in Pakistan

February

West Indies in New Zealand

MCC in Ceylon

References

International cricket competitions by season
1951 in cricket
1952 in cricket